Tom O'Lincoln is a United States born Marxist historian, author and one of the founders of the International Socialist Tendency in Australia. He attended UC Berkeley in 1966 and joined the International Socialists who had participated in the Free Speech Movement two years earlier. He has produced first-hand accounts of the 1974-5 revolution in Portugal, the Sandinistas in Nicaragua, the Philippines after the downfall of Ferdinand Marcos, the USSR under Mikhail Gorbachev, and the upheavals against Suharto in Indonesia. He is currently a member of the Trotskyist organisation Socialist Alternative, as well as its electoral alliance party Victorian Socialists, and an editor of the online journal Marxist Interventions.

Selected books 
 The Highway is for Gamblers: A Political Memoir, with Janey Stone, Interventions. Melbourne, 2017,
 Neighbour from Hell, Interventions, Melbourne, 2014.
 Australia's Pacific War: Challenging a National Myth, Interventions, Melbourne, 2011.
 Rebel Women in Australian Working Class History, (Co-editor with Sandra Bloodworth), Red Rag, Melbourne, 2008.
 United We Stand: Class Struggle in Colonial Australia, Red Rag, Melbourne, 2005.
 Class and Class Conflict in Australia, (Co-editor with Rick Kuhn) Longman Australia, Melbourne, 1996.
 Years of Rage: Social Conflicts in the Fraser Era, Bookmarks Australia, Melbourne, 1993.
 Into the Mainstream: The Decline of Australian Communism, Stained Wattle Press, Sydney 1985.

Selected articles 
 Why there's nothing good about Australian nationalism, Socialist Alternative,  Edition 124, January 2008.
 Trade unions and revolutionary oppositions: a survey of classic Marxist writings, School of Social Sciences, Faculty of Arts, Australian National University, 2008.

External links 
 Tom O'Lincoln's website

References 

Living people
Australian Trotskyists
Activists from Melbourne
Marxist writers
Labor historians
Year of birth missing (living people)
American emigrants to Australia
University of California, Berkeley alumni
International Socialist Tendency
Members of the International Socialists (United States)